Sofiane Feghouli (born 26 December 1989) is a professional footballer who plays for Turkish Süper Lig club Fatih Karagümrük and the Algeria national team. He mainly operates as a right midfielder, but can also play as a winger and as an attacking midfielder.

Feghouli made his senior international debut for Algeria in February 2012. He represented Algeria at the 2013, 2015, 2019 and 2021 Africa Cup of Nations (winning the 2019 tournament), as well as the 2014 FIFA World Cup, where he scored Algeria's first goal in the competition since 1986.

Personal life
Feghouli was born in Levallois-Perret to Algerian parents. His father is from Tiaret, while his mother is from Ghazaouet. He has 4 brothers.

Club career

Grenoble
Feghouli began his career with Grenoble, after French team Paris Saint-Germain decided not to sign him after a trial. For the latter portion of the 2006–2007 season, he was promoted to the first-team squad and given the number 33 shirt. He made his highly anticipated debut, at the age of 17, for the club on 27 April 2007 in a Ligue 2 match against Reims, appearing as a substitute. Grenoble won the match 1–0. He made two more appearances that season, including his first start on the final match day of the season against Montpellier on 25 May 2007. Montpellier won the match 1–0 with Feghouli playing 56 minutes before being subbed out. On 31 May 2007, he signed his first professional contract with Grenoble, keeping him with the side until 2010.

The following season, he was handed the number 8 shirt and, despite being 17 years of age, was given a more important role in the first-team squad. Despite having the pressure of being labelled the "new Zidane", his contribution to the squad was successful, appearing in 27 matches and scoring three goals, helping Grenoble achieve promotion to Ligue 1. His first career goal came on 18 January 2008 in a 4–3 away victory against Reims, the club he faced on his debut.

Feghouli returned for the 2009–10 season, making his debut on 29 August 2009 in a 1–0 defeat to Rhône-Alpes rivals Saint-Étienne. After appearing in five more matches, it was discovered by Grenoble officials that Feghouli had torn the meniscus in his right knee. The knee was successfully operated on in October. Following the surgery, Grenoble officials, most notably CEO Pierre Wantiez, were extremely critical of the player. Wantiez questioned Feghouli's long delay in returning to the team and the player's motives regarding a transfer as Feghouli would be out of contract in the summer and was already talking to several clubs, most notably Spanish club Valencia. Wantiez attributed Feghouli's recent moves to "bad advice" from the player's agent.

Valencia

On 20 May 2010, Feghouli signed a four-year deal with Valencia CF. He made his La Liga debut on 25 September, replacing Juan Mata in a 2–0 win against Sporting de Gijón.

On 28 January 2011, after appearing sparingly for the Valencian side, Feghouli was loaned to fellow league team UD Almería, until June. He appeared regularly for the Andalusians, however they were relegated at the end of the season.

After returning from Almería, and profiting from Mata and Vicente's departures, Feghouli became a starter, and scored his first goals for Los Che on 29 October 2011, netting a brace in a 3–1 home win against Getafe CF. His performances for Valencia in 2012 earned him two Algerian player of the year awards, Le Buteur's Algerian Ballon d'Or and the DZFoot d'Or.

On 11 April 2016, Feghouli was suspended by the club amid reports he refused to take part in a warm-down after the 2–1 home win over Sevilla the day before. He had also reportedly missed training a few days earlier.

He ended his Valencia career with 202 appearances, scoring 31 times and providing 40 assists.

West Ham United

On 14 June 2016, it was announced that Feghouli would be joining West Ham United on 1 July 2016 on a three-year contract. He made his West Ham debut on 28 July in a 2–1 away defeat to NK Domžale in the Third Qualifying Round of the Europa League. He scored his first competitive goal for West Ham the following week in the return fixture against Domžale, West Ham's first game at the London Stadium in which West Ham won 3–0, progressing to the UEFA Europa League play-offs. Feghouli made his first Premier League start in West Ham's first game of 2017, receiving a harsh red card after 15 minutes for a challenge on Manchester United defender Phil Jones in a 2–0 home defeat. After an appeal against the card by West Ham, it was rescinded on 4 January.

Galatasaray
In August 2017, Feghouli signed a five-year contract with Galatasaray. Galatasaray paid West Ham a €4.25 million transfer fee.

Fatih Karagümrük
On 30 November 2022, Feghouli joined Fatih Karagümrük on a one-and-a-half-year contract. He only became available for the team's official matches starting January 2023.

International career

France
Feghouli was eligible for both Algeria and France. Feghouli had stated his preference was to play for France and appeared in several France youth squads. On 12 November 2008, national team manager Raymond Domenech shortlisted the player for his pre-selection squad ahead of a friendly against Uruguay. Despite this, Algeria national team manager Rabah Saadane contacted Feghouli by telephone in an attempt to get the player to play for Algeria in the team's 19 November friendly against Mali. Team captain Yazid Mansouri also contacted the player.

Algeria
On 25 May 2011, it was reported that, whilst on loan at Almeria, Feghouli met with the President of the Algerian Football Federation Mohamed Raouraoua. Feghouli agreed to play for Algeria and was Invited to a training camp being held in Spain for the match against Morocco. He was unable to attend the session, but was touched by the gesture, agreeing to be available for the Tanzania match instead.

On 23 October 2011, the Algerian Football Federation announced that FIFA officially accepted Feghouli's request to switch allegiances from France to Algeria, and that he was eligible to represent Algeria in international competition as of that date. Two days later, on 25 October, Feghouli was called up by Algeria coach Vahid Halilhodžić for a pair of friendlies against Tunisia and Cameroon in November.

On 29 February 2012, Feghouli made his debut for the Algerian national team in a 2–1 Africa Cup of Nations qualifying win against Gambia, scoring the winning goal. During qualification for the 2014 FIFA World Cup, he scored three goals in seven appearances for Les Fennecs.

In the team's opening match of the 2014 World Cup, a 2–1 defeat to Belgium in Belo Horizonte, Feghouli scored with a penalty kick – Algeria's first World Cup goal in 28 years. He was surprisingly omitted from the 2017 African Cup Of Nations squad.

Career statistics

Club

International

Scores and results list Algeria's goal tally first, score column indicates score after each Feghouli goal.

Honours
Galatasaray
Süper Lig: 2017–18, 2018–19
Turkish Cup: 2018–19
Turkish Super Cup: 2019

Algeria
 Africa Cup of Nations: 2019

Individual
LFP Awards Best African player: 2014–15
DZFoot d'Or: 2012
Algerian Footballer of the Year: 2012

References

External links
Valencia official profile
La Liga profile

Ciberche stats and bio 

1989 births
Living people
People from Levallois-Perret
French sportspeople of Algerian descent
Footballers from Hauts-de-Seine
Algerian footballers
French footballers
Association football midfielders
Ligue 1 players
Ligue 2 players
Grenoble Foot 38 players
La Liga players
Valencia CF players
UD Almería players
French expatriate footballers
Expatriate footballers in Spain
France under-21 international footballers
France youth international footballers
Algerian expatriate sportspeople in Spain
Algeria international footballers
2013 Africa Cup of Nations players
2014 FIFA World Cup players
2015 Africa Cup of Nations players
2019 Africa Cup of Nations players
2021 Africa Cup of Nations players
West Ham United F.C. players
Expatriate footballers in England
Algerian expatriate sportspeople in England
Premier League players
Galatasaray S.K. footballers
Fatih Karagümrük S.K. footballers
Expatriate footballers in Turkey
Algerian expatriate sportspeople in Turkey
Süper Lig players